Simon Townsend (born 27 November 1945) is an Australian journalist who became a popular television host during the 1980s. He is now retired.

Vietnam War conscientious objector
In the mid-1960s whilst living in Woy Woy and working as a columnist for a community paper he became a conscientious objector against the Vietnam War.

I then went to Sydney, I met people, I joined the groups and I read. And suddenly I had an intellectual basis for my objection to the Vietnam War. And that was when I got very busy, objecting, going to court and I ended up in Long Bay Gaol for a month. And in 1968 I ended up in the army prison for a month. I was court-martialled while I was there."

Television Host
Townsend is best remembered in Australia as the host and producer of the popular children's show, Simon Townsend's Wonder World.

In 1993, he hosted a show on the Australian Broadcasting Corporation called TVTV. It contained a mixture of interviews with television personalities promoting their shows and reviews of television shows new to the screen.  Presenters of this show were Edith Bliss (who worked previously on Wonder World), and musician James Valentine formerly of the band, Models and Townsend.

He has also appeared on a celebrity version of Sale of the Century.

Personal life
Townsend has suffered three strokes.  In August 2005, he told ABC TV he feared the next stroke might kill him.

Townsend is the father of actress Nadia Townsend, who appeared on Channel 7's City Homicide.

Further reading 

 Scates, Bob (10 October 2022).  "Draftmen go free : A history of the Anti-Conscription Movement in Australia"  Book review.  Simon is mentioned in the book.  Commons Social Change Library. Retrieved 2 November 2022.

References

External links

Australian television presenters
Australian journalists
Australian conscientious objectors
Living people
1945 births